Honey Dijon may refer to:

 Honey Dijon, American DJ and producer
 a type of mustard; see dijon mustard
 a variety of rose; see Rosa 'Spek's Centennial'

See also

 Honey Mustard (disambiguation)
 
 Honey (disambiguation)
 Dijon (disambiguation)